Hellen Murshali was a South Sudanese politician. In 2011, she was the Minister of Social Welfare of Central Equatoria. In 2017, Hellen Murshali Boro became the Executive Director of Confident Children out of Conflict, helping orphans and neglected children in South Sudan.

References

Living people
South Sudanese women in politics
21st-century South Sudanese women politicians
21st-century South Sudanese politicians
Year of birth missing (living people)
People from Central Equatoria
Place of birth missing (living people)